Brian Till (born March 26, 1960 in Houston, Texas), is a racecar driver who formerly competed in the CART Championship Car series.  He raced in the 1992–1995 seasons with 20 career starts.

Racing career
Till had success early being named Rookie of the Year of the Houston Region of the SCCA in 1986. Not long after, he won the 1990 Atlantic Championship. In 1991, he joined the Indy Lights series and won the race at Mid-Ohio. In CART he ran 20 races, including the 1994 Indianapolis 500, where he finished 12th. Till had three top-ten finishes in CART competition.

Till drove full-time in the Trans-Am Series in 1995 and finished 9th in points.

Broadcasting career
After retiring as a professional driver, Till worked for the American Le Mans Series as a pit reporter for coverage of endurance sports car races and an instructor at the Mid-Ohio High Performance Driving school near Lexington, Ohio.

Currently, Till is contracted to NBC Sports but has also worked sports car and NASCAR Camping World Truck Series broadcasts for Fox Sports. On NBCSN, Till has filled in on the network's IndyCar coverage, particularly on weekends of both an IndyCar and Formula One race on the network. He has been play-by-play announcer on at least one IndyCar Series race per season since 2012.

Racing record

SCCA National Championship Runoffs

American Open Wheel
(key)

CART

References

External links
Driver Database Profile

1960 births
Living people
Indianapolis 500 drivers
Indy Lights drivers
Atlantic Championship drivers
Trans-Am Series drivers
Motorsport announcers
Racing drivers from Houston
Sportspeople from Houston
Barber Pro Series drivers
SCCA National Championship Runoffs participants

Dale Coyne Racing drivers
A. J. Foyt Enterprises drivers